The GW Community School is a teacher-owned and operated coeducational college preparatory school located in Springfield, Virginia, United States. It was founded in 1999 by Richard Goldie and Alexa Warden to serve the needs of bright, non-traditional learners and their families. The founders had previously been active in the founding of Commonwealth Academy before GW Community School was founded. It currently has an enrollment of 52 students, grades 9-12. Despite being located just outside Washington, D.C., the "GW" does not stand for "George Washington" but for "Goldie" and "Warden", the last names of the school's founders and current directors.

External links
 
 The GWCS Robotics Team Website
 Dictionary of the American Mind

Preparatory schools in Virginia
Private high schools in Virginia
High schools in Fairfax County, Virginia
Educational institutions established in 1999
1999 establishments in Virginia